Cyrillus Jarre (born February 2, 1878, in Ahrweiler, Rhine Province, Germany as Rudolf Jarre, died March 8, 1952, in Jinan, Shandong, China, also known as Cirillo Rudolfus Jarre) was a Franciscan Archbishop in Jinan, Shandong Province, China and a translator of texts on canon law and Chinese law between Latin and Chinese.

Jarre got into conflict with the new communist rulers of China early on. He opposed the formation of state-sanctioned Christian churches in China (Three-Self Patriotic Movement) and supported the Legion of Mary, an association of Catholic laity that was viewed as reactionary organization by the communists. As a consequence, Jarre was arrested by the Chinese authorities on July 25, 1951, and from October 17, 1951, onwards he was imprisoned in Jinan.

Jarre was subjected to conditions of poor sanitation, nutrition, isolation, repeated interrogation, as well as other forms of abuse. He died on March 8, 1952, in the St. Josephs Hospital of Jinan. Members of his diocese buried Jarre's body wrapped in the red clothes of a martyr, but the authorities exhumed his body with the intent to rebury him in a black prisoner's uniform. In the end, a compromise was reached and Jarre's body was buried in white clothes. His grave is located in the Lin Jia Zhuang Catholic cemetery to the southeast of Jinan.

References

1878 births
1952 deaths
People from Bad Neuenahr-Ahrweiler
People from the Rhine Province
20th-century German Roman Catholic priests
German Franciscans
20th-century Roman Catholic martyrs
Roman Catholic missionaries in China
German Roman Catholic missionaries
Franciscan missionaries
German people imprisoned abroad
Prisoners and detainees of the People's Republic of China
German people who died in prison custody
Prisoners who died in Chinese detention
20th-century Roman Catholic archbishops in China
German expatriate bishops